Georges Dubois (date of birth unknown, died 1934) was a French hurdler. He competed in the men's 400 metres hurdles at the 1908 Summer Olympics.

References

Year of birth missing
1934 deaths
Athletes (track and field) at the 1908 Summer Olympics
French male hurdlers
Olympic athletes of France
Place of birth missing